Joseph Mahmoud (born 13 December 1955 in Safi, Morocco) was a French athlete who mainly competed in the 3000 metre steeple chase.

He competed for France at the 1984 Summer Olympics held in Los Angeles, California, where he won the silver medal in the men's 3000 metre steeplechase event. He also competed in the same event at the 1992 Summer Olympics.

Achievements

References

External links
 

1955 births
Living people
French male long-distance runners
Olympic silver medalists for France
Athletes (track and field) at the 1984 Summer Olympics
Athletes (track and field) at the 1992 Summer Olympics
Olympic athletes of France
World Athletics Championships athletes for France
People from Safi, Morocco
French male steeplechase runners
Knights of the Ordre national du Mérite
Medalists at the 1984 Summer Olympics
Olympic silver medalists in athletics (track and field)
Mediterranean Games gold medalists for France
Mediterranean Games medalists in athletics
Athletes (track and field) at the 1983 Mediterranean Games